Rowilson Rodrigues (born 26 March 1987) is an Indian football player who plays as a centre back for Gokulam Kerala FC in the I-League.

Career
Rodrigues started his footballing career at SESA FA before joining Goan club Churchill Brothers and played with them for the I-League 2010-11 season but in June 2011 he moved from Churchill to local rivals Dempo
After a 2-year stint with Dempo, he moved to century-old Kolkata-based club Mohun Bagan in 2013.
In May 2014 Rodrigues rejoined Dempo after a difficult season with Mohun Bagan.

International
He was called up for India U-23's for the 2010 Asian Games, during which he was a regular starter throughout the tournament and helped the team reach the pre-quarter finals, where India lost to Japan. Following a good season, he was called up for the India national football team preparatory camp in June 2011.

Honours

India U23
SAFF Championship: 2009

References

External links

http://goal.com/en-india/people/india/28729/rowilson-rodrigues

1987 births
Living people
Footballers from Goa
Indian footballers
India international footballers
Churchill Brothers FC Goa players
I-League players
Dempo SC players
Mohun Bagan AC players
Indian Super League players
FC Goa players
India youth international footballers
Association football central defenders
Footballers at the 2010 Asian Games
Mumbai City FC players
Odisha FC players
Asian Games competitors for India
SESA Football Academy players
Gokulam Kerala FC players